Lobatodes, coined by C. Brown, is a genus of beetles in the family Carabidae, containing the following species:

 Lobatodes bullatus Basilewsky, 1956
 Lobatodes decellei Basilewsky, 1968

References

Licininae